Eric Yeo Oon Tat (17 July 1936 – 15 March 2015) was a Singaporean water polo player and  three-time Asian Games medallist. He also became the first Malayan swimmer since 1953 to clock under 60 seconds (58.7secs) for 100m Freestyle Men at the Chinese Swimming Club Championships.

He is most known for competing in the men's tournament at the 1956 Summer Olympics and has been recognised for his efforts to helping the national waterpolo team win a total of five gold medals in the biennial Southeast Asian Peninsular (SEAP) — now known as the Southeast Asian (SEA) Games — from 1965 to 1973.

References

External links
 

1936 births
Singaporean male water polo players
Olympic water polo players of Singapore
Water polo players at the 1956 Summer Olympics
Place of birth missing
Asian Games medalists in water polo
Asian Games silver medalists for Singapore
Asian Games bronze medalists for Singapore
Water polo players at the 1958 Asian Games
Water polo players at the 1962 Asian Games
Medalists at the 1958 Asian Games
Medalists at the 1962 Asian Games
20th-century Singaporean people